Moses Blessing Nyeman (born November 5, 2003) is an American professional soccer player who plays as a midfielder for Major League Soccer club Real Salt Lake, on loan from  S.K. Beveren.

Club career

Professional
Nyeman scored his first professional goal against Louisville City FC on July 29, 2019, for Loudoun United in the USL Championship.

On October 3, 2019, Nyeman signed with MLS club D.C. United. In doing so, he became the 13th homegrown player to be signed by D.C. United and, at age 15, the second youngest signing in club history. He continued to play for Loudoun United for the remainder of the 2019–20 season. During the MLS and USL offseason, he trained with Borussia Dortmund's U-19 team.

Nyeman made his MLS debut for D.C. United on August 29, 2020, in a 1–4 loss against the Philadelphia Union. He made his first start for the team on September 27, 2020, in a 0–2 loss against the New England Revolution.

On August 31, 2022, Nyeman joined Belgian Challenger Pro League side S.K. Beveren on a two-year deal for an undisclosed fee.

On February 20, 2023, Nyeman was loaned to Real Salt Lake for the 2023 MLS season.

International career
Nyeman is eligible to represent both his native Liberia and the United States. He has represented the United States at the under-16 level several times, but never in an official match.

Career statistics

Club

References

External links

 

2003 births
Living people
American soccer players
United States men's youth international soccer players
Liberian footballers
Liberian emigrants to the United States
American people of Liberian descent
Association football midfielders
Loudoun United FC players
D.C. United players
Real Salt Lake players
Soccer players from Maryland
USL Championship players
Place of birth missing (living people)
Homegrown Players (MLS)
Major League Soccer players